Konstantin Ludvig Lukash (September 16, 1890 in Plovdiv – March 15, 1945) was a Bulgarian officer and Chief of Staff of the Bulgarian Army from 11 August 1941 until the 11 May 1944.

Biography

Lukash was born on 16 September 1890 in Plovdiv, Bulgaria. He successfully applied at the Military School in Sofia. After he graduated on 22 September 1909 he was assigned as lieutenant to a regiment in the 22nd infantry division. On 1 January 1940 he was promoted to Lieutenant General. On 11 August 1941 he became Chief of Staff of the Bulgarian Army until May 11, 1944.

After the Bulgarian coup he was arrested on 21 September 1944, sent to the Soviet Union for interrogation on 2 January 1945, sentenced to death by the People's Court established by the government of the Fatherland Front and executed on 15 March 1945 in Sofia.

Sources 
 Oleg Beyda: "Wehrmacht Eastern Tours": Bulgarian Officers on the German-Soviet Front, 1941–1942, in: The Journal of Slavic Military Studies, Vol. 33 (2020), No. 1, pp. 136–161. Available here.

Weblinks 
 Lukash, Konstantin Ludvig, generals.dk (without date).

1890 births
1945 deaths
Bulgarian military personnel of World War I
Bulgarian military personnel of World War II
Bulgarian generals
Bulgarian military personnel of the Balkan Wars
Recipients of the Order of Bravery
Recipients of the Order of Military Merit (Bulgaria)
Chiefs of staff
Executed military leaders
People executed by the People's Republic of Bulgaria
Bulgarian people of Czech descent
Military personnel from Plovdiv
People executed by Bulgaria by firing squad
Executed Bulgarian people
People's Court (Bulgaria)